Norma Terris (born Norma Allison Cook; November 13, 1904 – November 15, 1989) was an American performer in musical theatre and vaudeville.

Early years 
Born in Columbus, Kansas, Terris was named after the heroine of Bellini's opera, Norma. Her grandmother and grandfather taught in college, and both initially opposed her going into acting. Undeterred, as a child she put on her own productions in a barn and on the family's front porch, A cousin enabled her to study dancing and drama.

In December 1920, she and Max Hoffman Jr. applied for a license to marry, but both were underage, so they did not wed then.

Career 
In the early 1920s, Hoffman and Terris debuted an act, "Junior and Terris" in Asbury Park, New Jersey. They went on to tour on the Interstate Circuit.

In vaudeville, Terris headlined two-a-day programs, appearing in productions by Schubert and Ziegfeld. She also gave a command performance for the Prince of Wales while she was in Europe.

Terris was known for her impersonations of popular public figures, which she had performed in Florenz Ziegfeld's Follies.  She originated the roles of Magnolia in the original Broadway production of Show Boat in 1927. She reprised her role in the first New York revival of the show in 1932. However, she was not selected to reprise her role in the 1929 part-talkie film, nor in the 1936 film version.

On September 2, 1920, Terris made her Broadway debut as a member of the chorus of The Ziegfeld Midnight Frolic at the New Amsterdam Theater. Her other Broadway credits included Queen O' Hearts (1922), A Night in Paris (1926), A Night in Spain (1927), The Well of Romance (1930), The Climax (1933), So Many Paths (1934), and Great Lady (1938).

For 10 seasons in the 1930s and 1940s, she starred in productions at the Muny Opera in St. Louis.

Terris was originally chosen to play the dual roles of Moonyean Clare and her niece Kathleen in Through the Years, Vincent Youmans's 1932 musical version of Jane Cowl's once-popular play, Smilin' Through, but she was replaced at the last minute.

She made two films during the early days of talking pictures - Married In Hollywood, and the 1930 version of Cameo Kirby, which was, like Show Boat, a riverboat musical involving a gambler. Cameo Kirby appears to be lost, and only twelve minutes of Married in Hollywood apparently survive.

Marriage
Terris and Hoffman married in Houston while they were touring with their act.

Terris married Dr. Jerome Wagner and retired to Lyme, Connecticut, where she was an avid supporter of the Goodspeed Opera House and what eventually became the Norma Terris Theatre. She was later married to Albert D. Firestone, son of the late William McKinley and Gladys Bigam Firestone of Greensburg, Pennsylvania. The couple spent winters at their Palm Beach, Florida residence, where they acted as major donors to the Ballet Florida, and summered at their Lyme, Connecticut. Mr. Firestone, who was very dedicated to her remembrance, died in 1997 at their summer residence in Lyme.

Last years
In 1972, Terris donated 30 acres of land on which the Norma Terris Humane Education and Nature Center was created.

She performed two one-woman shows, An Evening with Norma Terris (1969 and 1971) and A Tribute To Jerome Kern (1985). She created The Norma Terris Fund "to encourage achievements in musical theater" in 1987, and in 1989 she created a scholarship in her name to sponsor an internship at the Goodspeed Opera House.

Death
Terris died at her summer home in Lyme, Connecticut, on November 15, 1989, aged 87.

Legacy
In 1984, Goodspeed Musicals created a second performance venue in Chester, Connecticut, which is named the Norma Terris Theatre.

References

External links

Norma Terriss, right, with Daniel Frohman at National Press Club luncheon (Corbis)

1904 births
1989 deaths
Actresses from Kansas
American musical theatre actresses
American silent film actresses
People from Columbus, Kansas
20th-century American actresses
20th-century American singers
20th-century American women singers
Vaudeville performers